Omphalotukaia is a genus of sea snails, marine gastropod mollusks, in the family Calliostomatidae within the superfamily Trochoidea, the top snails, turban snails and their allies.

Species
Species within the genus Omphalotukaia include:
 Omphalotukaia hajimeana (Yoshida, 1948)
 Omphalotukaia nobilis (Hirase, 1922)
The following species were brought into synonymy:
Omphalotukaia midwayensis Lan, 1990

References

Calliostomatidae
Monotypic gastropod genera